Kisly is a surname. Notable people with the surname include:
 Artyom Kisly (born 1989), Belarusian ice hockey player
 Aleksandr Kisly (born 1974), Russian footballer

See also
 
 Kisly Klyuch
 Kislyak
 Kislyakov

Belarusian-language surnames
Russian-language surnames